Enese is a village in Győr-Moson-Sopron county, Hungary.

In 1526 it was property of Count György Cseszneky and during 16-17th centuries of the Cseszneky and Enessey families.

External links 
 Street map 

Populated places in Győr-Moson-Sopron County